Conerly is a surname. Notable people with the surname include:

Charlie Conerly (1921–1996), American football player
Conerly Trophy, an award given annually by the Mississippi Sports Hall of Fame
Matt Conerly (born 1967), American football player